Namaini is a tribe of soil-associated weevils from South Africa in the subfamily Entiminae.

Genera 
The following genera are recognized:
 Cervellaea Borovec & Meregalli, 2021 
 Nama Borovec & Meregalli, 2013 
 Namaquania Borovec & Meregalli, 2021
 Pentamerica Borovec & Meregalli, 2021
 Springbokia Borovec & Meregalli, 2021
 Yamalaka Borovec & Meregalli, 2021

References

External links 
 

Entiminae
Beetle tribes